The 2017 Sahlen's Six Hours of the Glen was an endurance race sanctioned by the International Motor Sports Association (IMSA). The race was held at Watkins Glen International in Watkins Glen, New York on the July 2nd, 2017. This race was the sixth round of the 2017 WeatherTech SportsCar Championship.

Practice and qualifying

Qualifying Results 

Results

Statistics 
Pole Position - #1 Pipo Derani - 1:34.405

Fastest Lap -  #52 Oliper Pla - 1:33.314

References

6 Hours of Watkins Glen
6 Hours of Watkins Glen
6 Hours of Watkins Glen